Mario Party 64 can refer to, any of the first three Mario Party video games, simply because they were on Nintendo 64:

Mario Party  (video game), 1998
Mario Party 2, 1999
Mario Party 3, 2000